Bernardo I of Kongo (died 1567) was a 16th-century manikongo (ruler) of the Kingdom of Kongo, a region encompassing areas in 21st-century Angola and the Democratic Republic of Congo. He came to power after murdering his half-brother Afonso II who was less well-disposed toward the Portuguese.

The rule of Bernardo I extended from 1561 to 1567. He was killed fighting the Yaka on Kongo's eastern frontier. The Yaka, who were referred to as Jagas by the Essikongo and the Portuguese, would invade and nearly conquer Kongo in 1568.

See also
List of Rulers of Kongo
Kingdom of Kongo

References

Manikongo of Kongo
16th-century births
1567 deaths
16th century in Africa
Place of birth unknown
Date of death unknown
Place of death unknown
Monarchs killed in action